Alucita philomela is a moth of the family Alucitidae. It is found in China (Yunnan).

References

Moths described in 1937
Alucitidae
Moths of Asia
Taxa named by Edward Meyrick